RSC Internacional Fútbol Club, is a Spanish football club based in Madrid, in the autonomous community of Madrid. Founded in 1973, it is the second reserve team of Real Madrid CF for the 2022–23 season, and plays in Tercera Federación – Group 7, holding home games at Ciudad Real Madrid, which has a capacity of 1,000 spectators.

History
Founded in 1973 as Club Deportivo San Ignacio de Loyola, the club changed name to Club Flat International in 2020. In 2021, after achieving a first-ever promotion to Preferente de Madrid, the club was again renamed, now into RSC Internacional Fútbol Club.

RSC Internacional finished first in their Preferente group, and achieved promotion to Tercera División RFEF. In July 2022, newspaper Marca announced that Real Madrid reached an agreement with the club to make Internacional their C-team for the 2022–23 season. In August, the new structure started having former Spanish international Luis García as manager, but with Internacional acting as an independent team from Real Madrid to avoid legal issues.

Season to season

1 season in Tercera Federación

See also
Real Madrid C

References

External links
Real Federación de Fútbol de Madrid profile 

Football clubs in the Community of Madrid
Association football clubs established in 1973
1973 establishments in Spain
Real Madrid CF